Schmieding is a surname. Notable people with the surname include:

Holger Schmieding (born 1958), German economist
Reinhold Schmieding (born 1955/56), American businessman